Catasetum globiflorum, the spheroid-flowered catasetum, is a species of orchid found in Brazil.

References

External links

globiflorum
Orchids of Brazil